Acrolophus anaphorella is a moth of the family Acrolophidae. It is found on the Windward Islands.

References

Moths described in 1892
anaphorella